Menkokia is a genus of ichneumon wasps in the family Ichneumonidae. There are at least four described species in Menkokia.

Species
These four species belong to the genus Menkokia:
 Menkokia blandii (Cresson, 1864) c g b
 Menkokia major (Heinrich, 1934) c g
 Menkokia minor (Heinrich, 1934) c g
 Menkokia minorisimilis (Heinrich, 1934) c g
Data sources: i = ITIS, c = Catalogue of Life, g = GBIF, b = Bugguide.net

References

Further reading

External links

 

Ichneumoninae